Happy Time or Happy Times may refer to:

Happy Time (Roy Eldridge album), a 1975 studio album
Happy Time (Junior Mance album), a 1962 studio album
Happy Time (TV program), a Philippine variety show on Net 25
Happy Times (2000 film), a Chinese film
Happy Times (2014 film), a Mexican film
The Happy Time, a 1952 American comedy-drama film based on a novel and a play of the same name
The Happy Time (musical), 1967, also based on the novel and play
First Happy Time, a period of successful German U-boat warfare during the Battle of the Atlantic, July 1940 - October 1940 or April 1941
Second Happy Time, a period of successful German U-boat warfare during the Battle of the Atlantic, January-August 1942